There were 7 female and 82 male athletes representing the country at the 2000 Summer Paralympics.

Medal table

See also
South Korea at the Paralympics
South Korea at the 2000 Summer Olympics

References

Bibliography

External links
International Paralympic Committee

Nations at the 2000 Summer Paralympics
Paralympics
2000